Musuvinakoppalu is a village in T. Narasipura taluk of Mysuru district in southern state Karnataka in India. This village is the headquarters of Muttalavadi Grama Panchayath in Sosale holbali in T. Narasipura Taluk.  It is on the left banks of Kaveri River.

Transport 
Musuvinakoppalu is connected by road with its taluk headquarters T. Narasipura (T. Narasipura - Musuvinakoppalu Road), Doddebagilu and Horalahalli. KSRTC provides buses from T. Narasipura to Musuvinakoppalu twice a day.

References 

Villages in Mysore district